Lenny Gomulka is an American musician, singer, songwriter, bandleader, composer, and publisher. One of his bands, Lenny Gomulka and Chicago Push, popular for American & Polish-style and Chicago-style polkas. Gomulka has also collaborated numerous times with Eddie Blazonczyk Sr., Jimmy Sturr and others.

Lenny Gomulka is the author of "Say Hello to Someone in Massachusetts", the official polka of the State of Massachusetts. He is an inductee of the International Polka Association Hall of Fame, and a twelve-time Grammy Award nominee.

References

External links
Official Web site of Lenny Gomulka and the Chicago Push

Living people
Musicians from Massachusetts
American songwriters
American bandleaders
Year of birth missing (living people)